Making Globalization Work is a book written by Nobel Prize laureate Joseph E. Stiglitz, who also wrote Globalization and Its Discontents and several other books.

Overview
The first major protest in Seattle, Washington against the World Trade Organization (WTO) and its role in promoting economic globalization came as a surprise to many, considering the positive impacts globalization was supposed to bring. According to Stiglitz, this was the first step in a widespread recognition that globalization was all “too good to be true.” Along with globalization comes myriad concerns and problems, says Stiglitz.

The first concern being that the rules governing globalization favors developed countries, while the developing countries sink even lower.
Second, globalization only regards monetary value of items, rather than other factors involved; one being the environment.
The next concern is how developing countries are controlled by globalization and the negative effects it can have on their democracies. Developing countries borrow a large amount of funds from other countries and the World Bank which essentially causes them to give up the benefits of their democracy because of the strings attached to the loan repayment.
The fourth concern regarding globalization is the notion that it does not live up to its original expectations. Globalization was advertised to boost countries economically; however, it has not shown improvement in developed nor developing countries.
Last but not least, the new system of globalization has basically forced a new economic system on developing countries. This new economic system is seen as the “Americanization” (Stiglitz, Page 9) of their policies as well as culture. This has caused quite a bit of resentment and financial damage.

In addition to these concerns, Stiglitz highlights that individual persons and whole countries are being victimized by globalization.

Stiglitz then goes on to provide an overview of how we might “reform” globalization, by noting representatives of the world’s national governments attended the Millennium Summit and signed the Millennium Development Goals, pledging to cut poverty in half by 2015. Additionally, the International Monetary Fund (IMF) had previously been focusing more on inflation, rather than employment and income; however, they have shifted their focus in hopes of reducing poverty. Stiglitz states that countries who seek financial assistance have in the past been asked to meet an outrageous number of conditions, in exchange for the aid. This was one of the most common complaints towards the IMF and the World Bank. They have heard these complaints and have since greatly reduced the conditionality. The G8 group met for their annual meeting in 2005 and had agreed to write off debt owed by the 18 poorest countries in the world as an attempt to help with the global poverty issue. As regards the aspiration to make trade fair,
originally, opening the market was done in hopes of helping the economy; however, the rights between the developing and developed countries have been skewed, and
the last trade agreement actually put the poorest countries in a situation in which they were worse off than to begin with.

Stiglitz focuses on the limitations of liberalization briefly to say the results of liberalization never lived up to the expectations; the developing countries were not able to follow through because their economic and political systems simply could not cope with the pressures.

Finally, Stiglitz also argues that protecting the environment is one of the most important issues and countries must work together to lessen the effects of global warming. Successful development in countries such as India and China has only increased energy usage and also the use of natural resources. People from all over the world must adjust their lifestyle in order to reverse the effects of global warming.

In order to see more success through globalization, there must be more use made of global governance structures. The voices of all, internationally, must be heard, rather than having the voice of the developed countries speak over those of the developing countries.

Reviews

References

External links 

 Selected Reviews of Making Globalization Work on Joseph Stiglitz' website (section Press)
 Economist preaches unified solution to world problems, review by Ken Symon in The Sunday Herald, September 3, 2006
 Reviews by Bruce Ramsey (The Seattle Times), Russ Juskalian (USA Today), Andrew Leonard (Salon.com), Jeffrey E. Garten (Newsweek), Chris Wilson (inthenews.co.uk), Stuart Wavell (The Sunday Times), John Hoberman (The Austin American-Statesman) and Jeffry A. Frieden (The New York Times)
 Gloomy About Globalization, review by Robert Skidelsky in The New York Review of Books, April 18, 2008

2006 non-fiction books
Books about globalization
Books by Joseph Stiglitz
W. W. Norton & Company books